Mesopotamia (before 1926: Τσετιράκι - Tsetiraki;) is a village and a former municipality in Kastoria regional unit, Western Macedonia, Greece. Since the 2011 local government reform it is part of the municipality Kastoria, of which it is a municipal unit. The municipal unit has an area of 99.173 km2. Population 4,224 (2011).

The municipality was formed at the 1997 Kapodistrias reform under the name Aliakmonas, after the river Aliakmonas. It was renamed to Mesopotamia in 2006. The village of Mesopotamia was the seat of the municipality.

Sights
Mesopotamia has three Byzantine style churches. The most recent and largest is that of the cathedral of St. Peter and St. Paul. The oldest church is the church of St. Constantine and St. Helen which contains the village cemetery, and the church of Saint Demetrios. The chapel of St. George is a few kilometers outside of the village.

There is a Cultural Center as well. This center supports and preserves the local culture. It holds annual ceremonies on May 19, a day of remembrance for the population, at the Forest of Mesopotamia near the Aliakmon River. Finally, the town also has bars and nightclubs.

Economy
Mesopotamia is a rural residential community. Its economy is entirely dependent on the agriculture of wheat. It also houses small private fur industry that is outsourced from the major fur traders of Kastoria. As the seat of the Aliakmonas municipality, Mesopotamia contains the Aliakmonas Municipal Building. It also contains a pharmacy, and a supermarket. The community of Mesopotamia has recently been linked to a branch of Northern Greece's brand new Egnatia Odos highway.

Sport
Mesopotamia has a football (soccer) team called Astrapi Mesopotamia or simply Astrapi (Greek: Αστραπή) and its origin year is believed to be in the mid-1950s, 1956-1957. It hosts games at the Municipal stadium of Mesopotamia.

Demographics
The Greek census (1920) recorded 1,021 people in the village and in 1923 there were 300 inhabitants (or 140 families) who were Muslim. Following the Greek-Turkish population exchange, in 1926 within Tsetiraki there were 140 refugee families from Pontus. The Greek census (1928) recorded 1,083 village inhabitants. There were refugee 141 families (594 people) in 1928.

References

Former municipalities in Western Macedonia
Populated places in Kastoria (regional unit)